Erbach is an Ortsgemeinde – a municipality belonging to a Verbandsgemeinde, a kind of collective municipality – in the Rhein-Hunsrück-Kreis (district) in Rhineland-Palatinate, Germany. It belongs to the Verbandsgemeinde Simmern-Rheinböllen, whose seat is in Simmern.

Geography

Location
The municipality lies in the eastern Hunsrück right on the Autobahn A 61. Southeast of the village is the edge of the Binger Wald (Bingen Forest).

History
Erbach belonged to the Electorate of the Palatinate Altes Gericht (“Old Court”). Beginning in 1794, Erbach lay under French rule. In 1814 it was assigned to the Kingdom of Prussia at the Congress of Vienna. Since 1947, it has been part of the then newly founded state of Rhineland-Palatinate.

Population development
What follows is a table of the municipality's population figures for selected years since the early 19th century (each time at 31 December):

Politics

Municipal council
The council is made up of 6 council members, who were elected at the municipal election held on 7 June 2009, and the honorary mayor as chairman.

Mayor
Erbach's mayor is Paul Schirra.

Culture and sightseeing

Buildings
The following are listed buildings or sites in Rhineland-Palatinate’s Directory of Cultural Monuments:
 Saint John the Baptist's Catholic Church (Kirche St. Johannes der Täufer), Hauptstraße – quarrystone aisleless church, 1730

References

External links
Information about Erbach 

Municipalities in Rhineland-Palatinate
Rhein-Hunsrück-Kreis